The People's Party of the Valencian Community (PP or PPCV) is the Valencian branch of the People's Party, as well as one of the historically most powerful organizations within the PP.

Upon its foundation, the PPCV remained at opposition under the leadership of Pedro Agramunt. However, after Eduardo Zaplana was elected as new party leader in 1993, the party was able to win the 1995 election by a simple majority and form a coalition government with Valencian Union. In 1999 the party obtained the absolute majority in the Valencian Courts, which it held for the next 16 years.

The party, which turned into one of the most powerful organizations in the Valencian Community, was expelled from government in the 2015 election after a 20-year uninterrupted stay in power amid accusations of political corruption and illegal financing. Post-election agreements between Compromís, PSPV and Podemos, as well as other minor left-wing forces, deprived it from the government of most main cities in the Community, which it had been controlling for decades.

History

Final term (2011–2015)

Two months after the 2011 election, in which the PPCV enlarged its absolute majority, President Francisco Camps resigned because of his alleged implication in the Gürtel case, a corruption scandal affecting senior regional party members unveiled in 2009 and that, since then, had begun eroding support for the party in the Community. Camps was replaced as President of the Valencian Government by Alberto Fabra. The following years saw the unveiling of a series of corruption scandals that rocked the PPCV, involving party MPs, mayors, local councillors, regional councillors, Courts' speakers and former regional president José Luis Olivas. At one point, up to 20% of the party MPs in the Valencian Courts (11 out of 55) were charged in different corruption cases; a joke popularized at the time said that they would become the third political force in the Valencian Courts, only behind PP and PSOE, if they were to form their own parliamentary group. The regional party leadership also had to cope with accusations of illegal financing as well as possible embezzlement in the additional costs incurred in the Formula 1 project and Pope Benedict XVI's 2006 visit to Valencia.

At the same time, the regional government had to deal with the effects of the ongoing financial crisis. Despite the community's decision to ask for a bailout from the central government headed by Mariano Rajoy in July 2012, its economic situation remained severe. Fabra's government had to close down RTVV, the regional public television broadcasting channel, because of financing issues; a decision which was met with widespread protest.

The 2014 European Parliament election resulted in enormous losses for the People's Party, which, in the largest Valencian cities, lost almost half of its votes in percentage terms compared to the previous elections. Both the economic crisis and corruption helped hasten the party's decline, which had already seen support drop in opinion polls since 2011. By 2015, corruption scandals had begun to reach party icons such as long-time Mayor of Valencia Rita Barberá, involved in an expenses scandal, embezzlement and a possible illegal party funding scheme at the regional level. The "Imelsa case", another related scandal, shook the PP 2015 electoral campaign as leaked recordings allegedly belonging to public entity Imelsa former director, Marcos Benavent, involved senior party officials, such as Xàtiva Mayor and President of the Valencia Deputation , in an alleged illegal financing network of the Valencian PP. The PP denounced Rus and expelled him from the party just 20 days ahead of the election, but he refused to withdraw as candidate and continued campaigning as an independent; the PP being unable to contest the local election in Xàtiva in a separate list.

As a result of these combined events, the party suffered a spectacular collapse in popular support in the 2015 regional election, where it lost 44% of its seats and 46% of its 2011 party vote. Thanks to an agreement between the PSPV, Compromís and Podemos in which Ximo Puig was appointed as new regional President with Mònica Oltra as his deputy, the PPCV was expelled from power after two decades in office.

Operation Taula
'Operation Taula', a major police operation in Valencia that took place on 26 January 2016, resulted in the arrest of several former and current high-ranking members from the regional PP branch, as a consequence of the ongoing investigation on the PP's corruption in the region during its time in government. Judicial investigation also pointed to former long-time Mayor of Valencia Rita Barberá as a participant in the scandal; her arrest or imputation only being prevented by the fact she had legal protection as an incumbent senator. A few days later, on 1 February, all PP city councillors in the city of Valencia were charged for a possible money laundering offense, including new local party leader Alfonso Novo, as well as most members of Barberá's late government.

Voices within the Valencian PP pointed to the party's refoundation in the region as a regionalist party, in order to try to distance itself as much as possible from the PPCV's past. Interim party leader Isabel Bonig claimed for an extraordinary party congress to be held to rethink the structure and future of the party in the Valencian Community, emphasizing its Valencian roots.

Leaders

Party Presidents
1989–1990: Management Board (headed by Juan Antonio Montesinos)
1990–1993: Pedro Agramunt
1993–2002: Eduardo Zaplana
2002–2011: Francisco Camps
2011–2015: Alberto Fabra
2015–2021: Isabel Bonig
2021–present: Carlos Mazón

Presidents of the Valencian Government
1995–2002: Eduardo Zaplana
2002–2003: José Luis Olivas
2003–2011: Francisco Camps
2011–2015: Alberto Fabra

Election results

Corts Valencianes

Cortes Generales

European Parliament

Notes

References

People's Party (Spain)
Political parties in the Valencian Community